Gahnia clarkei (also known as tall sawsedge) is a species of evergreen plant from a sedge family that can be found in Australia. They grow during summer and have large black to brownish flowers. The flowers contain heads that produce small red seeds.

References

External links
Gahnia clarkei
Tall Saw Sedge

clarkei
Flora of New South Wales
Flora of Queensland
Flora of Victoria (Australia)
Plants described in 1938